The Marked Woman or Marked Woman may refer to:

The Marked Woman (1914 film) starring Walter Connolly
Marked Woman, 1937 crime film